The Faithful Heart is a 1922 British drama film directed by Fred Paul and starring Owen Nares, Lillian Hall-Davis and Cathleen Nesbitt. It is an adaptation of the play The Faithful Heart by Monckton Hoffe.

Cast
 Owen Nares - Waverley Ango
 Lillian Hall-Davis - Blackie Anderway
 Cathleen Nesbitt - Diana Oughterson
 A.B. Imeson - Major Lestrade
 Ruth Maitland - Mrs Gattiscombe
 Cyril Raymond - Albert Oughterson
 Victor Tandy - Sergeant Brabazon
 Charles Thursby - Captain Ralkjam

References

External links

1922 films
1922 drama films
British silent feature films
Films based on works by Monckton Hoffe
Films directed by Fred Paul
Films produced by G. B. Samuelson
British drama films
British black-and-white films
1920s English-language films
1920s British films
Silent drama films